Flabellophora is a genus of poroid fungi in the family Steccherinaceae. The genus was circumscribed by New Zealand-based mycologist Gordon Herriot Cunningham 1965. Most species in the genus were described by E. J. H. Corner in 1987.

Species
, Index Fungorum accepts 20 species of Flabellophora:
Flabellophora aurantiaca Corner (1987) – Solomon Islands, Malaysia
Flabellophora brevipes Corner (1987) Brunei
Flabellophora deceptiva Corner (1987) – Malaya
Flabellophora fasciculata Ryvarden & Iturr. (2004) – Venezuela
Flabellophora flaviporus Corner (1987) – Malaya
Flabellophora inconspicua Corner (1987) – Malaysia
Flabellophora intertexta Corner (1987) – New Britain
Flabellophora kinabaluensis Corner (1987) – Malaysia
Flabellophora latiporus Corner (1987) – Malaya
Flabellophora licmophora (Massee) Corner (1987) – Malay Peninsula; Papua New Guinea; Brazil
Flabellophora nana Corner (1987) – Malaya
Flabellophora obtorta Corner (1987) – Malaya
Flabellophora ochracea Corner (1987) – Singapore; Brazil
Flabellophora parva Corner (1987) – Peru
Flabellophora squamosa Corner (1987) – Malaya
Flabellophora subsimplex Corner (1987) – Malaya
Flabellophora superposita (Berk.) G.Cunn. (1965) – New Zealand
Flabellophora variabilis Corner (1987) – Brazil
Flabellophora velutinosa Corner (1987) – Malaysia

References

Steccherinaceae
Polyporales genera
Taxa described in 1965
Taxa named by Gordon Herriot Cunningham